In the context of smart cards, an application protocol data unit (APDU) is the communication unit between a smart card reader and a smart card. The structure of the APDU is defined by ISO/IEC 7816-4 Organization, security and commands for interchange.

APDU message command-response pair

There are two categories of APDUs: command APDUs and response APDUs. A command APDU is sent by the reader to the card – it contains a mandatory 4-byte header (CLA, INS, P1, P2) and from 0 to 65 535 bytes of data. A response APDU is sent by the card to the reader – it contains from 0 to 65 536 bytes of data, and 2 mandatory status bytes (SW1, SW2).

References, this is the

External links
 Smartcard ISOs, contents 
 Selected list of smartcard APDU commands
 Selected list of SW1 SW2 Status bytes
 More information about APDU commands and APDU responses

Smart cards
ISO standards
IEC standards